George Kalaras (1781 – 23 December 1824) was a physician, a philosopher and a writer. He was born at Agionori of Corinthia in Greece and he studied medicine with philosophy at Pisa in Italy. He was initiated into Filiki Eteria in Corinth during 1818. He, in turn initiated several other Corinthians to Filiki Eteria, including Panoutsos Notaras.  He participated several events of the Greek War of Independence including the Battle of Dervenakia.

Paschalis Kitromilides in his treatise "From Republican Patriotism to National Sentiment" considers George Kalaras as a possible editor of the Hellenic Nomarchy, as Kalaras printed his University thesis, "A general idea of some qualities of the bodies and on the nature of qualities of temperature" at the printing workshop of Tommaso Masi at Livorno in Italy during 1806, where it is believed that the Hellenic Nomarchy may also have been printed, at approximately the same period of time. Kitromilides' view was backed up by K. Papachristos who brought more evidence to support the view that George Kalaras was the anonymous author/publisher of  the Hellenic Nomarchy.

George Kalaras was a member of the Second National Assembly in March 1823, as one of the representatives of Corinthia. He had three sons that he named Harmodius and Aristogeiton after the well known Athenian tyrannicides, and a third one, Thrasyboulos.

He died of pneumonia on 23 December 1824, during a diplomatic mission.

References

Bibliography 
Encyclopaedia The Helios

1781 births
1824 deaths
Greek revolutionaries
Greek people of the Greek War of Independence
Deaths from pneumonia in Greece
People from Tenea